Jenna Pittman Bracone is an American figure skater.  She was an International, and World Junior Team USA member. She trained under the following coaches: Scott Cudmore, John D'Amlio, Pauline Williams, Tracey Cahill Poletis, and Ron Ludington. She currently resides in New Jersey with her husband and two sons. She coaches at the Mennen Sports Arena rink in Morristown, New Jersey.

Competitive highlights

Education 

Pittman attended Meredith College in Raleigh, North Carolina and received a BA in Political Science and Psychology.

References

1978 births
Living people
American female single skaters
Meredith College alumni
21st-century American women